Wabe River (also Wabi River, Uabi River) is a west-southwest flowing river of south-central Ethiopia, entirely confined within the reaches of Gurage Zone of the Southern Nations, Nationalities, and Peoples' Region.

This river is a perennial river. The river rises at an elevation of 2,850 m in the Shewan highlands and discharges into the Omo river at an elevation of 1060 m.

Due to its steep gradient, it is a quickly flowing river with many falls. In particular to mention are the Acho Falls near Welkite with a height of 60 meters. Southwest of Welkite and several kilometers short of its confluence with the Omo River the river shows a very steep series of rapids with an elevation drop of ~400 m in just four kilometers. Due to its special characteristics, the river is (in 2018) under investigation for hydroelectric electricity generation by using the hydropower of the river.

See also 
 List of rivers of Ethiopia

References

Omo River (Ethiopia)
Rivers of Ethiopia